Anu Kristiina Nieminen (born 16 December 1977; née Weckström) is a Finnish badminton player. Born in Helsinki, Nieminen has joined the national team in 1994. She is one of the best badminton players in Finland, having won twelve times National Championships, and competed at the Summer Olympics in four consecutive times.

Nieminen first represented Finland at the Olympic level at the 2000 Summer Olympics in Sydney. She reached the second round before losing to Kanako Yonekura of Japan. In 2004 Olympics, she defeated in the round of 32 to Kaori Mori of Japan. In 2006, she signed with the Finnish cosmetics company Lumene, along with her husband, professional tennis player Jarkko Nieminen.

Nieminen competed at the 2008 Olympics, she again reached the second round, this time losing to Huaiwen Xu of Germany. In 2012 Olympics, she won her first match against Victoria Montero of Mexico, but lose a match to Tai Tzu-ying of Chinese Taipei, she did not advance beyond the group stages. In 2013, she has joined the Lillerød Badminton in Denmark as a coach for the young players.

Achievements

BWF International Challenge/Series 
Women's singles

Women's doubles

  BWF International Challenge tournament
  BWF International Series tournament

References

External links 
 
 
 Photo of Anu Nieminen

1977 births
Living people
Sportspeople from Helsinki
Finnish female badminton players
Olympic badminton players of Finland
Badminton players at the 2000 Summer Olympics
Badminton players at the 2004 Summer Olympics
Badminton players at the 2008 Summer Olympics
Badminton players at the 2012 Summer Olympics